Brigitte Skay (born Brigitte Johanna Riedle; 18 July 1940 - 19 November 2012) was a German film actress.

Career
Skay's foremost fame came with her lead role the Italian-West German co-production Isabella, Duchess of the Devils, followed by a number of Italian exploitation films during the 1970s.

Filmography

 (1963) - Petra Grothum
 (1968) - Susanne
 (1968) - Marion
Le 10 meraviglie dell'amore (1969) - Claudia
Ms. Stiletto (1969) - Isabella de Frissac
Zeta One (1969) - Lachesis
Quando suona la campana (1969) - Dorina
Beiß mich, Liebling (1970) - Dr. Stein
L'interrogatorio (1970) - Claudia
St. Pauli Nachrichten: Thema Nr. 1 (1971) - Georgine
Four Times That Night (1971) - Mumu
The Body in the Thames (1971) - Maggy McConnor
Zu dumm zum... (1971) - Mona
A Bay of Blood (1971) - Brunhilde
Man of the Year (1971) - Maid
Tutti fratelli nel West... per parte di padre (1972)
Studio legale per una rapina (1973) - Susy
Viaggia, ragazza, viaggia, hai la musica nelle vene (1973)
Lo strano ricatto di una ragazza per bene (1974) - Babel
San Babila-8 P.M. (1976) - Lalla
La Bestia in Calore (1977) - Irene (uncredited)
Enfantasme (1978)

References

External links
 

1940 births
2012 deaths
Actors from Mannheim
German film actresses
20th-century German actresses